Owen Douglas Dowling (1934 – 2008) was an Anglican bishop in Australia.

Dowling was educated at Melbourne High School and the University of Melbourne. He was a secondary school teacher until 1959.  He was ordained in 1960 and was a curate at Sunshine and Deer Park in the Diocese of Melbourne. He then became the vicar of St Philip's West Heidelberg and then the precentor and organist at St Saviour's Cathedral, Goulburn. From 1968 to 1972 he was the rector of South Wagga Wagga and then the Archdeacon of Canberra.

On 25 March 1981, he was consecrated an assistant bishop in the Diocese of Canberra and Goulburn and on 15 November 1983 was elected its diocesan bishop. He was installed on 17 December 1983 and retired on 1 January 1993. Dowling was an early protagonist for the ordination of women.

His last positions were incumbencies in Tasmania at St James' New Town, Hobart and Christ Church, Longford.

Dowling was married to Gloria; after his death she became a novice in the Community of the Holy Name. She died in 2020.

Publications 
  with Lawrence Bartlett
  with Steven Hallam

References 

 
 

1934 births
People educated at Melbourne High School
University of Melbourne alumni
Alumni of The Queen's College, Oxford
Anglican archdeacons in Australia
20th-century Anglican bishops in Australia
Anglican bishops of Canberra and Goulburn
Assistant bishops in the Anglican Diocese of Canberra and Goulburn
2008 deaths